Eastern Division of Camden was an electoral district for the Legislative Assembly in the then British colony of New South Wales from 1856 to 1857. Its name was changed to East Camden in January 1858, and it was largely replaced by the district of Illawarra in June 1859.

It elected two members simultaneously, with voters casting two votes and the first two candidates being elected. The electorate was situated in eastern Camden County, which adjoins the Cumberland County (Sydney Basin) to the south, including the Southern Highlands and, to the east, the Illawarra region.

Members for Eastern Division of Camden

Election results

References

Former electoral districts of New South Wales
1856 establishments in Australia
1859 disestablishments in Australia
Constituencies established in 1856
Constituencies disestablished in 1859